Senator Russell may refer to:

Australia
William Russell (Australian politician) (1842–1912), senator for South Australia (1907–1912)
Edward Russell (Australian politician) (1878–1925), senator for Victoria (1907–1925)

United States
Members of the U.S. Senate:
Richard Russell Jr. (1897–1971), senator from Georgia (1933–1971)
Donald S. Russell (1906–1998), senator from South Carolina (1965–1966)

Members of the New York State Senate:
Ebenezer Russell (1747–1836), senator from the Eastern District (1778–1782, 1784–1788, 1795–1803)
Michael Russell (Rensselaer County, New York) (1844–1901), senator from the 30th District (1901)
Charles H. Russell (Brooklyn) (1845–1912), senator from Kings County, 9th District (1880–1881) and the 3rd District (1882–1883)
Charles E. Russell (1868–1960), senator from the 9th District (1919–1920, 1923–1924, 1926–1929)

Members of other state senates:
Benjamin Russell (journalist) (1761–1845), Massachusetts State Senator
William Russell (Ohio politician) (1782–1845), Ohio Senator from Adams County (1819–1821)
Charles Theodore Russell (1815–1866), Massachusetts State Senator
J. Edward Russell (1867–1953), Ohio State Senator from the 12th District (1906–1909)
Lee M. Russell (1875–1943), Mississippi State Senator (1909)
Charles H. Russell (1903–1989), Nevada State Senator (1941–1946) 
John W. Russell Jr. (1923–2015), Oklahoma State Senator from Okmulgee County (1952–?)
Newton Russell (1927–2013), California State Senator from the 21st District (1974–1996)
John Russell (Missouri politician) (1931–2016), Missouri State Senator (1976–2000)
Steve Russell (politician) (born 1963), Oklahoma State Senator from the 45th District (2009–2013)

See also
Allen Russell (1893–1972), pitcher for the Washington Senators (1923–1925)
Jack Russell (baseball) (1905–1990), pitcher for the Washington Senators (1933–1936)